Carthage Lake is an unincorporated community in Henderson County, Illinois, United States.

Notes

Unincorporated communities in Henderson County, Illinois
Unincorporated communities in Illinois